David Thurman Macklin (born July 14, 1978) is a former American football cornerback. He was drafted by the Indianapolis Colts in the third round of the 2000 NFL Draft. He played college football at Penn State.

Macklin has also been a member of the Arizona Cardinals, Washington Redskins, St. Louis Rams and Kansas City Chiefs.

College career
Macklin was a three-year starter at Penn State University.  He was selected an All-Big Ten player as a junior in 1998, the year when he led the conference in interceptions with six.  As a freshman Macklin briefly played point guard for the Penn State basketball team after the football season had ended.
 
Macklin studied business logistics at Penn State.

Professional career

Indianapolis Colts
Macklin spent the first four years of his career with the Indianapolis Colts after being drafted in the third round of the 2000 NFL Draft. He reached the 2004 AFC Championship Game with Colts, but the team lost to eventual Super Bowl champion New England Patriots in that game.

Arizona Cardinals
Macklin signed as a free-agent contract with the Arizona Cardinals in 2004.  He scored his only NFL touchdown on a 60-yard interception return for the Cardinals in 2005.  He was released by the Cardinals in March, 2007, making him a free agent again.

Washington Redskins
On April 5, 2007, he agreed to a deal with the Washington Redskins.  He became a free agent at the conclusion of the season.

St. Louis Rams
Macklin signed with the St. Louis Rams in March 2008.  He spent training camp with the team, but was released during the final cuts on August 30.

Kansas City Chiefs
Macklin signed with the Kansas City Chiefs to a two-year contract on November 5, 2008.

He was released on March 18, 2009.

NFL statistics

Personal life
Macklin was arrested for DUI in Newport News, Virginia on March 13, 2009; a BAC test indicated that his level was above the legal limit.

Macklin runs a foundation named 27 Reasons (27 is his college and professional number) which aids underprivileged kids in Arizona and Virginia.

References

External links
27 Reasons Foundation
Arizona Cardinals bio
Kansas City Chiefs bio
St. Louis Rams bio

1978 births
Living people
Sportspeople from Newport News, Virginia
American football cornerbacks
Penn State Nittany Lions football players
Indianapolis Colts players
Arizona Cardinals players
Washington Redskins players
St. Louis Rams players
Kansas City Chiefs players